Selenops submaculosus is a species of flatty in the family of spiders known as Selenopidae. It is found in the United States, Bahama Islands, Cuba, and Cayman Islands.

References

Further reading

External links

 

Selenopidae
Articles created by Qbugbot
Spiders described in 1940